The 20th British Independent Film Awards nominations were announced on 1 November 2017.

Awards and nominations

Best British Independent Film
God's Own Country
The Death of Stalin
I Am Not a Witch
Lady Macbeth
Three Billboards Outside Ebbing, Missouri

Best Director
 Rungano Nyoni - I Am Not a Witch
Armando Iannucci - The Death of Stalin
 Francis Lee - God's Own Country
Martin McDonagh - Three Billboards Outside Ebbing, Missouri
 William Oldroyd - Lady Macbeth

Best Actress
Florence Pugh - Lady Macbeth
Emily Beecham - Daphne
Frances McDormand - Three Billboards Outside Ebbing, Missouri
 Margaret Mulubwa - I Am Not a Witch
Ruth Wilson - Dark River

Best Actor
Josh O'Connor - God's Own Country
Jamie Bell - Film Stars Don't Die in Liverpool
Paddy Considine - Journeyman 
Johnny Harris - Jawbone
Alec Secareanu - God's Own Country

Best Supporting Actress
Patricia Clarkson - The Party
Naomi Ackie - Lady Macbeth
Kelly Macdonald - Goodbye Christopher Robin
Andrea Riseborough - The Death of Stalin
Julie Walters - Film Stars Don't Die in Liverpool

Best Supporting Actor
Simon Russell Beale - The Death of Stalin
Steve Buscemi - The Death of Stalin
Woody Harrelson - Three Billboards Outside Ebbing, Missouri
Ian Hart - God's Own Country
Sam Rockwell - Three Billboards Outside Ebbing, Missouri

Most Promising Newcomer
Naomi Ackie - Lady Macbeth
Harry Gilby - Just Charlie 
Cosmo Jarvis - Lady Macbeth
Harry Michell - Chubby Funny
Lily Newmark - Pin Cushion

The Douglas Hickox Award (Debut Director)
Rungano Nyoni - I Am Not a Witch
Deborah Haywood - Pin Cushion
Francis Lee - God's Own Country
Thomas Napper - Jawbone
William Oldroyd - Lady Macbeth

Best Debut Screenwriter
God's Own Country - Francis LeeI Am Not a Witch - Rungano Nyoni
Jawbone - Johnny Harris
Lady Macbeth - Alice Birch
Their Finest - Gaby Chiappe

Breakthrough ProducerI Am Not a Witch - Emily MorganBad Day for the Cut - Brendan Mullin and Katy Jackson
God's Own Country - Jack Tarling and Manon Ardisson
Lady Macbeth - Fodhla Cronin O'Reilly
Pin Cushion - Gavin Humphries

Best ScreenplayLady Macbeth - Alice BirchThe Death of Stalin - Armando Iannucci, David Schneider and Ian Martin
God's Own Country - Francis Lee
I Am Not a Witch - Rungano Nyoni
Three Billboards Outside Ebbing, Missouri - Martin McDonagh

Best DocumentaryAlmost Heaven
Half Way
Kingdom of Us
Uncle Howard
Williams

Best Foreign Independent Film
Get Out
The Florida Project
I Am Not Your Negro
Loveless
The Square

Discovery Award
In Another Life
Even When I Fall
Halfway 
Isolani
My Pure Land

Best Casting
The Death of Stalin - Sarah Crowe
Film Stars Don't Die in Liverpool - Debbie McWilliams
God's Own Country - Shaheen Baig and Layla Merrick-Wolf
Lady Macbeth - Shaheen Baig
Three Billboards Outside Ebbing, Missouri - Sarah Halley Finn

Best Cinematography
Lady Macbeth - Ari Wegner
I Am Not a Witch - David Gallego
Jawbone - Tat Radcliffe
Leaning Into the Wind - Thomas Riedelsheimer
Three Billboards Outside Ebbing, Missouri - Ben Davis

Best Costume Design
Lady Macbeth - Holly Waddington
The Death of Stalin - Suzie Harman
How to Talk to Girls at Parties - Sandy Powell
I Am Not a Witch - Holly Rebecca
My Cousin Rachel - Dinah Collin

Best Editing
Three Billboards Outside Ebbing, Missouri - Jon Gregory
The Death of Stalin - Peter Lambert
Jawbone - David Charap
Us and Them - Joe Martin
Williams - Johnny Burke

Best Make-up and Hair Design
The Death of Stalin - Nicole Stafford
Breathe - Jan Sewell
I Am Not a Witch - Julene Paton
Journeyman - Nadia Stacey
Lady Macbeth - Sian Wilson

Best Music
Three Billboards Outside Ebbing, Missouri - Carter Burwell
The Death of Stalin - Christopher Willis
I Am Not a Witch - Matt Kelly
Jawbone - Paul Weller
Leaning Into the Wind - Fred Frith

Best Production Design
The Death of Stalin - Cristina Casali
Film Stars Don't Die in Liverpool - Eve Stewart
Final Portrait - James Merifield
I Am Not a Witch - Nathan Parker
Lady Macbeth - Jacqueline Abrahams

Best Sound
God's Own Country - Anna Bertmark
Breathe - Sound team
I Am Not a Witch - Maiken Hansen
Jawbone - Andy Shelley and Steve Griffiths
Three Billboards Outside Ebbing, Missouri - Joakim Sundström

Best Effects
The Ritual - Nick Allder and Ben White
The Death of Stalin - Effects team
Double Date - Dan Martin
Journeyman - Luke Dodd
Their Finest - Chris Reynolds

References

External links
 Website

British Independent Film Awards
2017 film awards
Independent Film Awards
2017 in London
November 2017 events in the United Kingdom